The Ensemble "Grenada" is a musical group, founded in 1973 in the Institute of Latin America Studies of the Russian Academy of Sciences as a political song ensemble. Since 1993, Ensemble "Grenada" is the national ensemble of Russia.

Background 
The Ensemble performs to audiences both in Russia and throughout the world, performing a range of music including folk tunes, Latin music, popular Soviet and Russian music. The group's repertoire has included: The Volga Boatmen's Song, Kalinka, Katyusha.

In 1979, the Ensemble became the winner of the XI World Festival of Youth and Students in Havana.
In 1980, they took part in the cultural program of the 1980 Summer Olympics.
In 1985, they became the winner of the XII World Festival of Youth and Students in Moscow, Russia.
 
The Ensemble "Grenada" frequently takes part in international folklore festivals (Belgium, China, Italy, Scotland, Greece, etc.). Since 1978 to 2006 the head of the ensemble was Sergey Vladimirsky. Since 2006 to present days the head of the ensemble is Tatiana Vladimirsky.

Awards 
 Artur Becker Medal (1987);
 Order Bernardo O’Higgins (2010);
 Order Francisco de Miranda (2011);
 Prize of the Federal Security Service of the Russian Federation (2017);

References

External links
 

Soviet performing ensembles
Russian musical groups
Musical groups established in 1973
Musical groups from Moscow